Hot Import Nights (HIN) is an auto show featuring domestic, compact and tuner import cars. The show originated in California and has been hosted in various major cities throughout the United States.

The Company
The Hot Import Nights Company is based in southern California's Orange County with a network of associates nationwide as well as in Europe, Asia, Africa, and South America. The company serves the car enthusiast community which it helped build over the past two decades.

Hot Import Nights (HIN) is the world's largest and most unique indoor/outdoor automotive lifestyle event and the leading influencer in the tuning culture market. In addition to a dazzling display of the nation's best and most numerous customized show cars, this one-of-a-kind pop culture experience also features live performances with social media influencers in a unique lights-out, nightclub atmosphere. Over the years, revelers have been treated to elaborate product displays from participating sponsors and vendors.  The events are attended by thousands of automotive and entertainment enthusiasts each year across the globe for two generations and running!

Events and the Community 
Since 1998 Hot Import Nights hosted single-night events in a number of different cities across the World. The locales include standard metropolitan cities such as Los Angeles, Phoenix, San Jose, Seattle, New York, Miami and Chicago, as well as more exotic ones such as Honolulu.  Hot Import Nights is also in various countries around the world such as Australia, London, Canada, and many countries in Asia and Europe.

Many noteworthy mainstream hip hop artists performed at these shows. There have also been performances by noteworthy DJ's, trance and Electronic dance music artists.

Hot Import Nights shows combine a nightclub-like atmosphere with "tuner" (automotive modification) competitions. HIN also highlights the growing subculture of compact car owners, representing both domestic and imported vehicles.

On November 20, 2022 EDM Artist Freya Fox headlined Hot Import Nights Honolulu as part of a promotional tour campaign before the inaugural LA3C festival by Penske Media ft Hot Import Nights. She was joined by models Vicky Li, Facebook Gaming Partner Tracy Ng, and ring model Won Cha.

Models / Miss HIN 
In addition to vehicles, Hot Import Nights events typically feature promotional models. These models promote the products of individual companies/magazines/websites with booths, participate in fashion shows, and dance on stage with a DJ playing the music selections.

References

External links 

 Hot Import Nights Official site
 Hot Import Nights Official community site
 Hot Import Nights Official Store

Auto shows in the United States